Alepidiella is a genus of plant bugs in the family Miridae. There is one described species in Alepidiella, A. heidemanni.

References

Further reading

 
 
 
 

Phylinae
Articles created by Qbugbot
Cimicomorpha genera
Monotypic Hemiptera genera